Arthur Taylor von Mehren (1922 – January 16, 2006) was an American professor at Harvard Law School and a scholar of international law.

Early life and education 
Von Mehren was born in 1922 in Albert Lea, Minnesota. He was the identical twin brother of Robert von Mehren.

He graduated from Harvard in 1942, received a law degree in 1945, and later received a doctorate in government.

Career 
When he received his doctorate in government, von Mehren was appointed as an assistant professor at Harvard Law School.

Von Mehren spent the first three years of his career studying French law, German law, and Swiss law in Europe.

Von Mehren taught at Harvard Law School for more than fifty years. In 1991, von Mehren was named the Story Professor of Law Emeritus at Harvard Law School.

Von Mehren was the former head of the United States delegation to the Hague Conference on Private International Law.

Von Mehren was a founding member and a former president of the American Society of Comparative Law.

Von Mehren was the editor of the American Journal of Comparative Law for a period of time.

Publications 
Von Mehren published ten books and hundreds of articles during his life.

Personal life 
Von Mehren was married to Joan Moore von Mehren. He was fluent in French and German.

Death 
Von Mehren died on January 16, 2006, in Cambridge, Massachusetts. He was 83 years old and died of pneumonia.

References 

1922 births
2006 deaths
Harvard Law School faculty
International law scholars
Harvard College alumni
Harvard Law School alumni